Stephen P. Spratt (born October 3, 1950) is an American politician who served two non-consecutive terms as a Democratic member of the New Hampshire House of Representatives. After first being elected in 2006, he decided to challenge Peter Bragdon in 2008 for the state's 11th district senate seat rather than run for reelection. He ran again successfully for the House in 2012 and was named an assistant majority leader by Speaker Terie Norelli.

References

External links

Democratic Party members of the New Hampshire House of Representatives
1950 births
Living people
Providence College alumni
21st-century American politicians